Grays Peak is the tenth-highest summit of the Rocky Mountains of North America and the U.S. state of Colorado. The prominent  fourteener is the highest summit of the Front Range and the highest point on the Continental Divide and the Continental Divide Trail in North America. (There are higher summits, such as Mount Elbert, which are near, but not on, the Divide.) The peak is the highest point in both counties.

Botanist Charles C. Parry made the first recorded ascent of the summit in 1861 and named the peak in honor of his botanist colleague Asa Gray. Gray did not see (and climb) the peak until 1872, eleven years later. Grays Peak is commonly mentioned in conjunction with adjacent Torreys Peak.

Climbing
Like the other fourteeners nearby, Grays Peak is considered to be an easy hike by fourteener standards, and is very popular among weekend climbers. Often a climb to the summit of Grays Peak is accompanied by continuing on to Torreys Peak, less than a mile away. The main trail, Grays Peak Trail, departs from Stevens Gulch. With cuts in the road over two feet deep and large stones in the path, travel to the trailhead is only feasible for high-clearance four-wheel-drive vehicles, motorcycles or all-terrain vehicles.

The trail, well-marked and well-trodden, begins by following the gulch for a slow rise in elevation, before hitting the steeper slopes. The summit includes a very small U-shaped rock shelter where a log book is maintained. Extensive views stretch south to Pike's Peak and the San Luis Valley, east to the Great Plains, West to Silverthorne, and north to Longs Peak and Rocky Mountain National Park. At the climber's option, the trail continues from the summit north to Torreys Peak.

Wildlife
Wildlife in the area includes, mountain goat, pika, cougar or mountain lion, mule deer, elk, marmot, coyote, ptarmigan, American red squirrel, and Canada jay. Wildflowers that bloom in the tundra area on the Continental Divide of the Americas include moss campion (Silene acaulis), alpine forget-me-not (Myosotis alpestris), sky pilot (Polemonium viscosum), sea pink, old-man-of-the-mountain (Rydbergia grandiflora), and mountain gentian (Gentiana). Below the tree-line, the blooms of monkshood or wolfsbane, blue columbine, fireweed, and paintbrush (Castilleja) can be found.

Gallery

See also

List of mountain peaks of North America
List of mountain peaks of the United States
List of mountain peaks of Colorado
List of Colorado county high points
List of Colorado fourteeners
Continental Divide of the Americas

Notes

References

External links

 Grays and Torreys Peaks on 14ers.com
 Grays and Torreys Peaks on TrailCentral.com

Mountains of Colorado
Mountains of Clear Creek County, Colorado
Mountains of Summit County, Colorado
Arapaho National Forest
Fourteeners of Colorado
Great Divide of North America
North American 4000 m summits